Sattleria haemusi is a moth in the family Gelechiidae. It was described by Peter Huemer in 2014. It is found in the Rila Mountains of Bulgaria and Šar Planina in North Macedonia.

References

Sattleria
Moths described in 2014